The Women's 100 metres grade II event was one of the events held in Ice sledge speed racing at the 1988 Winter Paralympics.

In total, five competitors from three nations competed in the event. All three medals were won by Norwegian competitors.

Results

Final

References 

100 metres grade II